Zhang Donglian is a Chinese sport shooter. She represents China at the 2020 Summer Olympics in Tokyo.

References

1982 births
Living people
Chinese female sport shooters
Shooters at the 2020 Summer Olympics
Olympic shooters of China
People from Jingdezhen
Asian Games medalists in shooting
Shooters at the 2006 Asian Games
Shooters at the 2018 Asian Games
Medalists at the 2006 Asian Games
Asian Games gold medalists for China